Feliciano "Felix" Magro (born 2 February 1979) is a former footballer. Born in Switzerland, he represented both that nation and Italy at youth international levels.

Magro's father is from Capo d'Orlando, Sicily and his mother is from Lucerne.

Career
Magro was signed by Udinese in January 2000, signing a contract until 2004. He was loaned back to Switzerland, first to FC Basel and then to FC Zürich, but he broken his leg in 2002 and had to rest for a year.

He came to Djurgårdens IF on free transfer from Landskrona BoIS at the start of the 2005 season, and he returned from a loan to AC Lugano. In late 2007, when his contract with DIF had run out, he signed a three-year contract with IFK Norrköping. In January 2009, he terminated his contract with the club. and joined Grasshopper Club Zürich.

After a few months without a team, he left for 1.Liga side Chiasso in April 2010 and won promotion back to the Challenge League.

International
A Swiss youth international, Magro chose to represent Italy in 1999. He played for the Italy U20 team at the 2000 Toulon Tournament.

Honours
 Djurgårdens
 Allsvenskan: 2005

References

External links
 Profile at Swiss Football League 
 Profile at FIGC 

1979 births
Footballers from Zürich
People of Sicilian descent
Swiss people of Italian descent
Living people
Swiss men's footballers
Italian footballers
Association football midfielders
Italy youth international footballers
Switzerland youth international footballers
Grasshopper Club Zürich players
Udinese Calcio players
FC Basel players
FC Zürich players
Landskrona BoIS players
Djurgårdens IF Fotboll players
FC Lugano players
IFK Norrköping players
FC Chiasso players
FC Mendrisio players
Swiss Super League players
Allsvenskan players
Swiss Challenge League players
Swiss 1. Liga (football) players
Italian expatriate footballers
Expatriate footballers in Sweden
Italian expatriate sportspeople in Sweden
Swiss expatriate sportspeople in Sweden